The D+D Real Czech Masters is a European Tour golf tournament played annually in the Czech Republic. The inaugural tournament was played from 21 to 24 August 2014 at the Albatross Golf Club in Prague.

Winners

Notes

References

External links
Official website
Coverage on the European Tour's official site

European Tour events
Golf tournaments in the Czech Republic
Sport in Prague
Recurring sporting events established in 2014
2014 establishments in the Czech Republic